The Women's downhill competition at the FIS Alpine World Ski Championships 2023 was held at Roc de Fer ski course in Méribel on 11 February 2023.

Results
The race started at 11:00 CET (UTC+1).

References

Women's downhill